Bowler's Wharf is an unincorporated community in Essex County, in the U.S. state of Virginia.

References

Unincorporated communities in Virginia
Unincorporated communities in Essex County, Virginia